Ortakand (also Romanized as Ortākand, Owrtāgand, and Ūrtākand) is a village in Zavin Rural District, Zavin District, Kalat County, Razavi Khorasan Province, Iran. At the 2006 census, its population was 173, in 49 families.

References 

Populated places in Kalat County